William Bernhardt is an American thriller/mystery/suspense fiction author best known for his "Ben Kincaid" series of books .

Awards
Bernhardt has sold more than 10 million books in the United States and around the world.  He has been nominated for the Oklahoma Book Award 17 times in three categories (Fiction, Poetry, and Young Adult) and has won twice, in 1995 and 1999. In 1998 he received the Southern Writers Guild's Gold Medal Award. In 2000, he was honored with the H. Louise Cobb Distinguished Author Award, given "in recognition of an outstanding body of work that has profoundly influenced the way in which we understand ourselves and American society at large." That same year, he was presented with a Career Achievement Award at the 2000 Booklovers Convention in Houston. He has been inducted into the Oklahoma Writers Hall of Fame. In 2009, he received the Royden B. Davis Distinguished Author Award from the University of Scranton, making him the only author to receive both the Davis and the Cobb Distinguished Author awards. His poetry has received two Pushcart Prize nominations and an Oklahoma Book Award nomination. He has also received a Certificate of Recognition from the American Academy of American Poets.

Career
Bernhardt is best known for his series of novels featuring idealistic attorney Ben Kincaid. Library Journal called him the "master of the courtroom drama." In 2010 he said that he was going to put the series on hiatus to focus on other projects, but in early 2017, he announced that he was bringing the character back in a novel to be titled, Justice Returns. He has written several novels outside the series, including the nonfiction Nemesis: The Final Case of Eliot Ness.  Bernhardt spent over two years researching that book, which provides a compelling solution to the unsolved mystery of the identity of The Mad Butcher of Cleveland, generally considered America's first true serial killer. His other series character, Susan Pulaski, appears in the novels Dark Eye and Strip Search.

Bernhardt founded the Red Sneaker Writing Center, which hosts an annual writing workshop each year in Oklahoma and small-group seminars throughout the country.  He provides a free Red Sneaker e-newsletter and a free Red Sneaker phone app which he updates regularly with a blog on writing and the publishing business. Successfully published graduates of Bernhardt's writing seminars include New York Times-bestselling author Aprilynne Pike, UK national bestseller Sarah Rees Brennan, Oklahoma Book Award winner Sheldon Russell, Oklahoma Book Award nominee Audrey Streetman, Greg Field, Michael W. Hinkle, Callie Hutton, Lela Davidson, Rick Stiller, Angela Christina Archer, Tamara Grantham, Bill Fernandez, Kenneth Andrus, Paul Dalzell, John Biggs, Bill Wetterman, Sabrina A Fish, Lara Wells, Burke Holbrook, Rick Ludwig, and more than a dozen other published writers. He has also written the nonfiction Red Sneaker series on writing.

In addition to his work as a writer and teacher, Bernhardt and his wife published books and a literary journal as the Balkan Press (formerly HAWK Publishing). He has published books by acclaimed authors such as Pulitzer Prize-winning novelist N. Scott Momaday, Grammy Award-winning singer-songwriter Janis Ian, and PBS newsman Jim Lehrer.  The primary focus of the company, however, has been to provide a publishing venue for the unpublished.  Bernhardt published the first novel by P.C. Cast, now known for her highly successful House of Night series of young adult novels.

Bernhardt is on the Board of Directors for the Writers Colony at Dairy Hollow in Eureka Springs, Arkansas.

A former trial attorney at Hall Estill, Bernhardt has received several awards for his pro bono work and public service. In 1994, Barrister Magazine named him one of the top 25 young lawyers in America. He lives in Tulsa, Oklahoma with his wife, Lara Bernhardt, the novelist (The Wantland Files) and audiobook narrator, and their children.  On October 10, 2013, Bernhardt became a Jeopardy! champion, fulfilling a lifelong dream of appearing on that quiz show.

Bibliography

"Ben Kincaid" Series
 Primary Justice (1991)
 Blind Justice (1992)
 Deadly Justice (1993)
 Perfect Justice (1994)
 Cruel Justice (1996)
 Naked Justice (1997)
 Extreme Justice (1998)
 Dark Justice (1999)
 Silent Justice (2000)
 Murder One (2001)
 Criminal Intent (2002)
 Death Row (2003)
 Hate Crime (2004)
 Capitol Murder (2006)
 Capitol Threat (2007)
 Capitol Conspiracy (2008)
 Capitol Offense (2009)
 Capitol Betrayal (2010)
 Justice Returns (2017)

Other Books
 The Code of Buddyhood (1992)
 Double Jeopardy (1995)
 The Midnight Before Christmas (1998)
 Final Round (2001)
 Bad Faith (2002)
 Dark Eye (2005)
 Strip Search (2007)
 Nemesis: The Final Case of Eliot Ness (2009)
 Story Structure: The Key to Successful Fiction (2010)
 Creating Character: Bringing Your Story to Life (2011)
 Perfecting Plot: Charting the Hero's Journey (2012)
 The White Bird (poetry) (2013)
 Dynamic Dialogue: Letting Your Story Speak (2014)
 Sizzling Style: Every Word Matters (2014)
 The Black Sentry (young adult) (2014)
 Equal Justice: The Courage of Ada Lois Sipuel (biography for young readers) (2014)
 Shine (young adult) (2015)
 The Game Master (2015)
 The Ocean's Edge (poetry) (2016)
 Challengers of the Dust (2016)

External links
 Official Website
 Fantastic Fiction biography
 Writers Review interview (Internet Archive version)
 William Bernhardt: Oklahoma's Renaissance Man, Dottie Witter, Oklahoma State University Library Perspectives newsletter, Issue 28, Spring 2001
Modern Signed Books BlogTalkRadio Interview with Rodger Nichols February 2016

21st-century American novelists
American male novelists
American mystery novelists
Living people
1960 births
Writers from Tulsa, Oklahoma
21st-century American male writers
Novelists from Oklahoma
Writers from Oklahoma
Poets from Oklahoma